Nurpur is a village at Fenchuganj Upazila in Sylhet, Bangladesh. It is about four miles long and 3 miles wide. It is the biggest village in Fenchuganj Upazila. It is not far from Upazila and Police Station.

Populations and Religious
Nearly ten thousand people live in Nurpur. The population is majority Muslim, but there is a small Hindu population as well.

Education

 Colleges
Mahmud Us Samad Farjana Chowdhury Girls School and College
Fenchuganj Business Management College
 Primary schools
Dorgahpur Primary School
 Faqirpara Community School
 Madrasahs
 Asiya Khanom Hafizia Madrasah.
 Darul Ulum Islambazar Madrasah.

Mosques

 Delwar Hussain Jam-E Masjid
 Nurpur Jam-E Masjid
 Jummatila Jam-E Masjid
 Nurpur Bazari Tilla Jam-E Masjid
 Uttartila Jam-E Masjid
 Faqirpara Jam-E Masjid
 Faqirpara Panjegana Masjid etc.

Leader
 Mahmud Us Samad Chowdhury MP
 Nurul Islam Basit U.P Chairman

See also
 Fenchuganj Upazila

References

Villages in Sylhet District
Fenchuganj Upazila